Michael J. Bragman (born August 11, 1940) is an American politician from New York.

Biography
He was born on August 11, 1940, in Syracuse, Onondaga County, New York. He graduated from Syracuse University in 1963.

He entered politics as a Democrat, and was elected to the Cicero Town Council in 1965, and to the Onondaga County Legislature in 1969. He was a member of the New York State Assembly from 1981 to 2001, sitting in the 184th, 185th, 186th, 187th, 188th, 189th, 190th, 191st, 192nd, 193rd and 194th New York State Legislatures.

Bragman served as Majority Leader from 1993 to 2000, when he lost his position after leading an attempted coup against Speaker Sheldon Silver. After Bragman announced his intent to overthrow Silver, the incumbent speaker demoted two high-ranking legislators who openly supported Bragman and made clear he would punish others who voted against him. In the floor vote on May 23, 2000, Silver prevailed by a vote of 85 to 63. Bragman resigned his seat in December 2001 and was succeeded by Republican William E. Sanford after a special election.

Bragman and his wife, Suzanne (a trustee of the North Syracuse Education Foundation), have three children. The athletic stadium at Cicero-North Syracuse High School, only a few thousand yards from his home in Cicero, New York, was named in his honor.

Notes

1940 births
Living people
Politicians from Syracuse, New York
Democratic Party members of the New York State Assembly
Syracuse University alumni
People from Cicero, New York